Samuel Lim Nuñez (born May 24, 1993) is a Paraguayan football player currently playing for Persidafon Dafonsoro in Indonesia Super League.
Nuñez plays striker, and weighs 77g (170 lb).

References

External links
SAMUEL LIM MUNEZ at Liga Indonesia

1993 births
Living people
Paraguayan footballers
Paraguayan expatriate footballers
Paraguayan expatriate sportspeople in Indonesia
Expatriate footballers in Indonesia
Liga 1 (Indonesia) players
Persidafon Dafonsoro players
Association football forwards